Destilando Amor (English: Distilling Love) is a Mexican telenovela produced by Nicandro Díaz González for Televisa in 2007. It is a remake of the 1994 Colombian telenovela Café, con aroma de mujer.

On Monday, January 22, 2007, Canal de las Estrellas started broadcasting Destilando Amor weekdays at 9:00pm, replacing Mundo de fieras. The last episode was broadcast on Sunday, September 16, 2007 with Pasión replacing it the following day.

It stars Angélica Rivera, Eduardo Yáñez, Sergio Sendel, Chantal Andere, Ana Martín, Martha Julia, Alejandro Tommasi and Ana Patricia Rojo.

It was named "The Best Telenovela of the Year" by Premios TVyNovelas in 2008.

Plot
The story begins in the fields of Jalisco, where the harvesting of the agaves takes place each year. Workers Teresa "Gaviota" Hernandez and Clarita Hernandez go on the bus from Guadalajara to Tequila and from there, go to La Montalveña Hacienda, property of Amador Montalvo. At the same time, Amador comes to Tequila with his wife Pilar. The patriarch of the Montalvo family has a feeling he will die, but his wife tells him it is nonsense. While his son Felipe and his wife Constanza are visiting, Amador is dying, and he tells the overseer of the Hacienda Roman, to not leave Gaviota and Clarita without work. Meanwhile, most of the family is overseas. Bruno, son of Amador and Pilar, and his wife Fedra, are in New York City managing the headquarters of the Montalvo Corporation. Rodrigo, Aaron, and Sofia are living in London (Sofia is living with James O'Brien), and Daniela is in Paris studying dance. The four get calls from the rest of the family saying Amador is dying, so they leave what they are doing and leave at once. Amador dies, and the funeral is held the next day.

At the mass that is held for him, Gaviota leaves some flowers at the coffin, and Rodrigo goes to the front and pray at the same time as Gaviota. That is how the two first meet. Gaviota and Rodrigo begin meeting each other, and Rodrigo tells Gaviota that he will have to go to London and keep on studying for a doctorate at Cambridge University. The day before Rodrigo has to go, he and Gaviota go into the agave fields and make love. After Rodrigo leaves, Gaviota finds out she is pregnant. So she goes with this photographer who has been bothering her every year she comes to take pictures as a model and send her to Paris. Gaviota accepts, and in the end, goes to Paris with Madame Colette (Rebecca Mankita). At her arrival at Paris, Gaviota finds out she was tricked, and finds out she was sent to work as a prostitute. Gaviota escapes, and since she hasn't eaten food, she faints in front of a restaurant. Benvenutto Verducci, the owner of the restaurant, helps her and gives her money to go to London.

At her arrival, Gaviota searches for Rodrigo, until she sees him at the corner of a street. Excited, she crosses the street without looking, and she ends up being run over very grotesquely by a car. Rodrigo sees the accident, and he goes for a closer look, but he doesn't see who it is because he gets a call from his uncle Bruno saying that his parents, Constanza and Felipe, died in a plane accident at Toluca International.

Gaviota and her mother Clarita find a small apartment in Mexico City. Gaviota finds a job as a hotel receptionist. She looks for another job and sees an opening for a secretary at Montalvo Enterprises. She applies, using the assumed name Mariana Franco Villareal, the name given to her when she went to Paris. She interviews with Aaron, the head of the company and Rodrigo's cousin. Gaviota is insistent with Aaron that he hire her. Finally, she is hired as a receptionist. Meanwhile, the provision in Amador's (the late patriarch) will specifies that the first-born son is heir to the Montalvo fortune. Minerva, Aaron's wife, is insistent that she become pregnant first. Aaron, a womanizer, runs around with Pamela Torreblanca, an old friend. Minerva finds out that Gaviota is working at Montalvo Enterprises and tries her best to get Gaviota fired. Isadora continues to try to seduce Rodrigo, to no avail. Rodrigo and Gaviota are still in love with each other. Minerva announces she is pregnant. Rodrigo thinks Gaviota is working on a farm in Veracruz, so he goes there to try to find her.

Little does he know she is working for the family business. Gaviota has worked her way up in the company all the way to manager, much to the dismay of some of the Montalvo family. Minerva thinks her husband Aaron is sleeping with Gaviota, which he isn't. He is sleeping with Pamela Torreblanca, his mistress. Gaviota decides to change her name legally to Mariana Franco. She has to call Rodrigo on an important matter, and is hesitant.
Meanwhile, Minerva and Aaron fight, causing Minerva to fall down stairs.

Minerva loses her baby. There is a provision in Amador's will saying that management of the company has to be done by a family member. All hands point to Rodrigo. He doesn't want to, but he has to go to the office on the important matter that Gaviota called him about earlier. Gaviota tries to disguise herself, to no avail. Rodrigo finds Gaviota, and they embrace and kiss. Now that he has found Gaviota, Rodrigo decides he wants to run the company. Gaviota and Rodrigo get together. Meanwhile, Aaron is involved in shady dealings with the company that he's trying to cover up by using Rodrigo and Gaviota. They go to the ports, separately, to check on tequila shipments. Meanwhile, Isadora wants to be artificially inseminated. She undergoes tests in Mexico, then goes to Houston for treatment. A neighbor, Francisco, discovers her and tries to seduce her.

He succeeds, and they go on a trip to Acapulco together. Aaron decides he wants to divorce Minerva because she won't give him a son. He wants to marry Pamela and hopes she'll give him the son he wants. Gaviota becomes friendly with Benvenuto, an Italian chef. Rodrigo, in his jealousy, thinks she is running around with Benvenuto, when the friendship is strictly platonic. While working in the office late one night, Gaviota sings her farmer's song. Minerva and Isadora overhear her, and find out that Mariana is Gaviota, and scheme to get her fired from the company.

Mariana is fired and is made to appear as if she had robbed the company and was Aaron's mistress. She leaves and breaks all memories from the past. Gaviota and her mother endure hard economic times haunted by the powerful Montalvo family. Someone who knew her from his good works with Montalvo's enterprise help her talking to Rodrigo about her hardship so he makes a  reference letter  to The Regulatory Commission of Tequila so she is accepted to work there.

Cast

Main

Angélica Rivera as Teresa Hernández García "Gaviota" / Mariana Franco Villareal de Montalvo
Eduardo Yáñez as Rodrigo Montalvo Santos
Sergio Sendel as Aarón Montalvo Iturbe
Chantal Andere as Minerva Olmos de Montalvo
Ana Martín as Clara Hernández García
Martha Julia as Isadora Duarte Toledo de Montalvo
Alejandro Tommasi as Bruno Montalvo Gil
Ana Patricia Rojo as Sofía Montalvo Santos de la Vega

Also main

Julio Alemán as Roberto Avellaneda
Martha Roth as Doña Pilar Gil Vda. de Montalvo
José Luis Reséndez as Hilario Quijano
Olivia Bucio as Fedra Iturbe Solórzano de Montalvo
Gustavo Rojo as Néstor Videgaray
Jaime Garza as Román Quijano
Roberto Vander as Ricardo Duarte
Norma Lazareno as Nuria Toledo de Duarte
Jan as Patricio Iturbe Solórzano
Raúl Padilla "Chóforo" as Crispín Castaño
Fernanda Castillo as Daniela Montalvo Santos
Julio Camejo as Francisco de la Vega
María Prado as Josefina "Jose" Chávez
Carlos de la Mota as James O'Brien
Sugey Abrego as Nancy
Alicia Encinas as Bárbara de Torreblanca
Miguel Galván as Carmelo
Adriana Laffan as Ofelia de Quijano
Rubén Morales as Lic. Quintana
Edgardo Tejeda as Elvis
Silvia Ramírez as Lluvia Camargo
Salvador Ibarra as Lic. Medina
Yuliana Peniche as Margarita
Archie Lafranco as Benvenuto Bertolucci
Mariana Ríos as Sanjuana Escajadillo de Quijano
Theo Tapia as Gaspar Torreblanca
Rebeca Mankita as Colette
Jacqueline Voltaire as Madre Felicity
Joaquín Cordero as Don Amador Montalvo
Joana Benedek as Pamela Torreblanca

Special participation

Irma Lozano as Constanza Santos de Montalvo
Jorge Vargas as Felipe Montalvo Gil
Julieta Bracho as Elvira
Adalberto Parra as Melitón
Bibelot Mansur as Acacia
Humberto Elizondo as Sr. De La Garza
Rosita Bouchot as Flavia
Alejandro Aragón as Maximino Vallejo
Luis Couturier as Artemio Trejo
David Ostrosky as Eduardo Saldívar
Virginia Gutiérrez as Altagracia
Luis Uribe as Lic. Lorenzo Oñate
Toño Infante as Gelasio Barrales
Hugo Macías Macotela as Arnulfo
Julio Vega as Lic. Montesinos
Rosángela Balbó as Josephine
Patricia Manterola as Erika Robledo
Gabriela Goldsmith as Cassandra Santoveña
René Strickler as Dr. Alonso Santoveña
Laura Flores as Priscila Yurente
Pedro Armendáriz Jr. as Irving Thomas
Alma Muriel as Public ministry
Manuel Landeta as Rosemberg
Nora Salinas as Karen

Track listing
 "Por Amarte" - Pepe Aguilar
 "Ay Gaviota" - Angélica Rivera (Gaviota)
 "La Campirana" - Destilando Amor (Rolitacampirana 4)
 "Llegando a Ti" - Angélica Rivera (Gaviota)
 "Esos Altos de Jalisco" - Angélica Rivera (Gaviota)
 "Campo Abierto" - Destilando Amor (Rolitacampirana 3)
 "Esta Triste Guitarra" - Pepe Aguilar
 "Penas del Alma" - Angélica Rivera (Gaviota)
 "Enamorandonos" - Destilando Amor
 "Cielo Rojo" - Pepe Aguilar
 "Musica del Campo" - Destilando Amor (Rolitacampirana 1)
 "Corazoncito Tirano" - Angélica Rivera (Gaviota)
 "Echame a Mi la Culpa" - Pepe Aguilar
 "Luz de Luna" - Angélica Rivera (Gaviota)
 "Ilusion de Amarte" - Destilando Amor
 "El Impedimento" - Destilando Amor
 "Poder y Soberbia" - Destilando Amor
 "Gaviota (Son Jalisciense)" - Angélica Rivera (Gaviota) (Bonus Track)

Awards and nominations 

Recognition to "La Gaviota" (Angélica Rivera) for the international projection generated by the telenovela "Destilando Amor" to spread the culture of the most Mexican beverage in the world: Tequila (Date 2007)

References

External links

 at esmas.com 

2007 telenovelas
Mexican telenovelas
2007 Mexican television series debuts
2007 Mexican television series endings
Spanish-language telenovelas
Television shows set in Mexico
Televisa telenovelas
Mexican television series based on Colombian television series